Ibragimov–Iosifescu conjecture for φ-mixing sequences in probability theory is the collective name for 2 closely-related conjectures by Ildar Ibragimov and :ro:Marius Iosifescu.

Conjecture 
Then  is asymptotically normally distributed.

-mixing coefficients are defined as
,

Reformulated:

Suppose  is a strictly stationary sequence of random variables such that

Per Ibragimov, under these assumptions, if also  is -mixing, then a central limit theorem holds. Per a closely-related conjecture by Iosifescu, under the same hypothesis, a weak invariance principle holds. Both conjectures together formulated in similar terms:

Then per Ibragimov , and per Iosifescu .

Sources 
I.A. Ibragimov and Yu.V. Linnik, Independent and Stationary Sequences of Random Variables, Wolters-Noordhoff, Groningen, 1971, p. 393, problem 3.
M. Iosifescu, Limit theorems for ϕ-mixing sequences, a survey. In: Proceedings of the Fifth Conference on Probability Theory, Brașov, 1974, pp. 51-57. Publishing House of the Romanian Academy, Bucharest, 1977.

Conjectures
Probability theory